Cavendish Square is a shopping centre in Claremont, Cape Town. It was at the time the largest upscale centre to open in Cape Town and was a project of Stuttafords department store. Original tenants included a full-line Stuttaford's store, a Greatermans department store, whose space was later taken by Garlicks. The centre opened September 7, 1972. 

Current anchors include Woolworths South Africa, Cotton On, H&M, Mr Price, Pick n Pay, and Ster-Kinekor Theatres (Including a loyalty club and a D-Box cinema). It also hosts the Made in the Cape artisans market. The investment firm Old Mutual, through their subsidiary Old Mutual Property, are the current owners of Cavendish Square.

References

Shopping centres in Cape Town
Buildings and structures in Cape Town